
Gary Lynn Hargis (born November 2, 1956) is a former Major League Baseball player who played in one game for the Pittsburgh Pirates in 1979. He made his lone appearance as a pinch runner in an extra-innings game on the next-to-last day of the season.

See also
Cup of coffee

References

Further reading

External links
, or Retrosheet

1956 births
Living people
Baseball players from Minneapolis
Buffalo Bisons (minor league) players
Columbus Clippers players
Gulf Coast Pirates players
Major League Baseball infielders
Navegantes del Magallanes players
American expatriate baseball players in Venezuela
Niagara Falls Pirates players
Pittsburgh Pirates players
Portland Beavers players
Salem Pirates players
Shreveport Captains players